Harmon is a village in Lee County, Illinois, United States. The population was 120 at the 2010 census, down from 149 in 2000.

Geography
Harmon is located at  (41.720660, -89.555298).

Demographics

As of the census of 2000, there were 149 people, 58 households, and 44 families residing in the village. The racial makeup of the village was 99.33% White, and 0.67% from two or more races. Hispanic or Latino of any race were 4.03% of the population.

There were 58 households, out of which 41.4% had children under the age of 18 living with them, 67.2% were married couples living together, 5.2% had a female householder with no husband present, and 24.1% were non-families. 19.0% of all households were made up of individuals, and 8.6% had someone living alone who was 65 years of age or older. The average household size was 2.57 and the average family size was 2.98.

In the village, the population was spread out, with 24.2% under the age of 18, 10.7% from 18 to 24, 27.5% from 25 to 44, 22.8% from 45 to 64, and 14.8% who were 65 years of age or older. The median age was 38 years. For every 100 females, there were 125.8 males. For every 100 females age 18 and over, there were 126.0 males.

The median income for a household in the village was $58,750, and the median income for a family was $63,750. Males had a median income of $33,864 versus $19,375 for females. The per capita income for the village was $14,697. There were 2.6% of families and 3.2% of the population living below the poverty line, including no under eighteens and 30.0% of those over 64.

Notable people
Hubert D. Considine, Illinois state representative and businessman, was born in Harmon.
John P. Devine, lawyer and Speaker of the Illinois House of Representatives, was born in Harmon.

References

Villages in Lee County, Illinois
Villages in Illinois